In beekeeping, in a Langstroth hive, burr comb, also known as brace comb and bridge comb, are portions of honeycomb built by the bees in other places than in the intended place in the frames. Burr comb is commonly found on the top of frames, particularly if the hive has been assembled with a void above the frames; burr comb may also be found hanging from the bottom of frames, if the frame itself is too shallow in height for the height of the hive it has been put in. Burr comb can cause problems if they join together frames on the hive which should stay separate (thus 'bridging' the gap between frames with comb).

Care should be taken when removing burr comb, as the adult queen bee may be found on it, or the comb itself may contain brood cells, including sometimes queen brood cells.

References

External links
Example of burr comb, built out from a frame of comb into an adjacent void where a frame had been removed and not replaced

Beekeeping